Mount Shinn is a 10,995-foot-elevation (3,351 meter) mountain summit located west of the crest of the Sierra Nevada mountain range in Fresno County of northern California, United States. It is set within the John Muir Wilderness, on land managed by Sierra National Forest. Precipitation runoff from this mountain drains north to Florence Lake via tributaries of the South Fork San Joaquin River.

History

The mountain's name was proposed by members of the U. S. Forest Service to honor Charles Howard Shinn (1852–1924), forest supervisor of Sierra National Forest. He was also a charter member of the Sierra Club and author. This landform's toponym was officially adopted in 1925 by the U.S. Board on Geographic Names.

The first ascent of the summit was made August 8, 1925, by Francis A. Corey.

Climate
According to the Köppen climate classification system, Mount Shinn is located in an alpine climate zone. Most weather fronts originate in the Pacific Ocean, and travel east toward the Sierra Nevada mountains. As fronts approach, they are forced upward by the peaks (orographic lift), causing them to drop their moisture in the form of rain or snowfall onto the range.

Gallery

See also

List of mountain peaks of California

References

External links
 Weather forecast: Mount Shinn
 Mt. Shinn (photo): Flickr

Sierra National Forest
Mountains of Fresno County, California
Mountains of the John Muir Wilderness
North American 3000 m summits
Mountains of Northern California
Sierra Nevada (United States)